Lentilactobacillus buchneri is a gram-positive, non-spore forming, anaerobic, rod prokaryote. L. buchneri is a heterofermentative bacteria that produces lactic acid and acetic acid during fermentation. It is used as a bacterial inoculant to improve the aerobic stability of silage. These bacteria are inoculated and used for preventing heating and spoilage after exposure to air.

Characteristics
L. buchneri is a part of the Lactobacillaceae bacteria family. The genus of the bacteria is Lentilactobacillus and the species is Lentilactobacillus buchneri.

History
E.B.Fred, W.H. Peterson, and J.A. Anderson initially discovered the species in 1921 and it was categorized based on the ability to metabolize certain carbon and sugars. This early study showed that this can produce acetic acid, carbon dioxide and large amounts of mannitol. Mannitol which is another carbon source that can be used to produce lactic acid.

Research
L. buchneri are sensitive to low heat and are slow growing. Lactic acid is converted to two most common products which are acetic acid and 1,2-propanediol. Higher concentrations of acetic acid are produced rather than 1,2-propanediol. They both are more effective at reducing the growth of mold and yeast than lactic acid. Strains of L. buchneri may be found in wine since it involves growth of lactic acid bacteria for malolactic fermentation. For this reason winemakers are encouraged to inoculate some malolactic starters to replace indigenous microflora.

Growth in L. buchneri inoculants occurs at 37 °C.

L. buchneri inoculants should only be used when heating cannot be controlled through management.

Treatment and prevention
Although it is not recommended to treat lactobacilli infections, penicillin is the most common treatment for these infections.

Use fermented substances sparingly or inoculate L. buchneri with fermented substances.

Usage
L. buchneri is most beneficial in places where aerobic instability is expected. For instance, high moisture corn is susceptible to spoilage when exposed to air, and for this reason L. buchneri inoculants may benefit. They also may benefit in situations where corn silage is expected to be transferred from one silo to another.

Products
There are many strains of L. buchneri and they are not all necessarily equally effective. Wyeast has a liquid form of L. buchneri used for the making of beer.

Biosafety level
Appropriate safety procedures should always be used with this material. This is a level 1 organism. Suitable for handling microbes that do not cause disease in a healthy human. precautions: hand washing with antibacterial soap and washing surfaces with disinfectants after use.

See also
 Fermentation (biochemistry)
 lactic acid bacteria

References

 Driehuis,  F., W. J. W. H. Oude Elferink, and S. F. Spoelstra.  1999.  Anaerobic lactic acid degradation during ensilage of whole crop maize inoculated with Lactobacillus buchneri inhibits yeast growth and improves aerobic stability.  J. Appl. Microbiol.  87:583-594.
 Danner, H., Holzer, Mayrhuber, E., and Braun, R. 2003. Acetic acid increases stability of silage under aerobic conditions. Applied and Environmental Microbiology 69(1) 562-567.
 Grazia, L., Suzzi, G., 1984. A survey of lactic acid bacteria in Italian silage. Journal of Applied Bacteriology 56:373-379.
 Knapp, J. 2012. Does Converting Simple Sugars to Lactic Acid Reduce the Energy Available in Silages? Feedstuffs:
 Kung Jr, L. 2010. Aerobic stability of silage. Proceeding 2010 California Alfalfa & Forage Symposium and Corn/Cereal Silage Conference. University of California.
 Ranjit, N.K. and Kung, Jr, L. 2000. The effect of Lactobacillus buchneri, Lactobacillus plantarum, or a chemical preservative on the fermentation and aerobic stability of corn silage. Journal of Dairy Science 83:526-535.
 Schmidt, R. J., Hu, W., Mills, J. A., and Kung, Jr, L. 2009. The development of lactic acid bacteria and Lactobacillus buchneri and their effects on the fermentation of alfalfa silage. Journal of Dairy Science 92:5005-5010.
 Oude Elferink, S., Krooneman, J., Gottschal, J., Spoelstra, S., Faber, F. and Drlehuls, F. 2001 Anaerobic conversion of lactic acid to acetic acid and 1,2 propanediol by Lactobacillus buchneri. Applied and Environmental Microbiology. 67:125-132
 Thomas, K.C., Hynes, S. H., and Ingledew, W.M. 2002. Influence of medium buffering capacity on inhibition of Saccharomyces cerevisiae growth by acetic and lactic acids. Applied and Environmental Microbiology 68(4) 1616-1623.
 Johns Hopkins POC IT Center: Lactobacillus
 MayoClinic.com: Reye's Syndrome
 The Merck Manual Online Medical Library: Intravenous Fluid Resuscitation

External links
 L. buchneri as a silage inoculant from Hay and Forage magazine
 Type strain of Lactobacillus buchneri at BacDive -  the Bacterial Diversity Metadatabase

Lactobacillaceae
Fodder
Gram-positive bacteria
Bacteria described in 1903